Kei Tomozawa (born May 18, 1999) is an American soccer player who currently plays college soccer at Stanford.

Career
Tomozawa began his youth career with Hawaii Slammers FC before moving to Bellevue, Washington in 2013. He attended Bellevue High School, graduating in 2017.

He then went on to join the Sounders FC academy.  On May 14, 2016, he made his debut for USL club Seattle Sounders FC 2 in a 2–0 defeat to Sacramento Republic. 

Tomozawa has also represented the United States in the U18 and U19 level, making one international appearance on March 16, 2016 against Uruguay.

References

External links
Stanford University bio
U.S. Soccer bio
USSF Development Academy bio
Top Drawer Soccer bio

1999 births
Living people
American soccer players
Stanford Cardinal men's soccer players
Tacoma Defiance players
Association football midfielders
Soccer players from Hawaii
USL Championship players
United States men's youth international soccer players
American sportspeople of Japanese descent
Soccer players from Washington (state)
Sportspeople from Bellevue, Washington